, there were about 47,000 electric vehicles in the Republic of Ireland. , about 13% of new cars registered in the country were fully electric, and 7% were plug-in hybrid.

Government policy
, the government offers tax rebates of up to €5,000 for electric vehicle purchases.

In 2022, the government introduced rebates of up to €25,000 for taxi drivers who replace their gasoline-powered taxis with EVs.

, the government's official policy goal is for 40% of cars in the country to be electric by 2030.

Charging stations
, there were 1,350 public charging stations in the Republic of Ireland.

, the government offers rebates of up to €600 for charging station installations.

Public opinion
In a 2022 survey conducted by Energia and the Irish Electric Vehicle Owners Association, 87% of respondents said that the Irish government was "not doing enough" to promote electric vehicles.

By region

Connacht
, there were 172 public charging stations in County Galway.

Leinster
, there were 639 public charging stations in County Dublin and 174 in County Kildare.

Munster
, there were 239 public charging stations in County Cork.

See also
 IrishEVs

References

Ireland
Road transport in the Republic of Ireland